Wasiu Eshinlokun Sanni (born 24 March 1961) is a Nigerian politician who has served as deputy speaker of the Lagos State House of Assembly since 2015. In February 2023, he was elected to the Nigerian Senate to represent Lagos Central senatorial district in the 10th National Assembly.

Early life

Political career

References

1961 births
Living people
Yoruba politicians
People from Lagos State
Politicians from Lagos
University of Lagos alumni
Action Congress of Nigeria politicians
Members of the Lagos State House of Assembly
Nigerian Muslims
21st-century Nigerian politicians
All Progressives Congress politicians